RBT may refer to:

 Ringback tone, a signaling tone in telecommunication 
 Risk-based testing, a type of software testing that prioritizes features and functions
 Random breath test or sobriety checkpoints
 RBT (TV series), an Australian factual television show about sobriety checkpoints
 Red–black tree, a data structure in computer science
 Residence-based taxation, a taxation system on personal income
 Residual block termination, in cryptography, a method for dealing with a final undersized data block